This list compares various amounts of computing power in instructions per second organized by order of magnitude in FLOPS.

Scientific E notation index: 2 | 3 | 6 | 9 | 12 | 15 | 18 | 21 | 24 | >24



Deciscale computing (10−1) 
 5×10−1: Computing power of the average human mental calculation for multiplication using pen and paper

Scale computing (100) 
 1 OP/S: Power of an average human performing calculations using pen and paper
 1 OP/S: Computing power of Zuse Z1
 5 OP/S: World record for addition set

Decascale computing (101) 
 5×101: Upper end of serialized human perception computation (light bulbs do not flicker to the human observer)

Hectoscale computing (102) 
 2.2×102: Upper end of serialized human throughput. This is roughly expressed by the lower limit of accurate event placement on small scales of time (The swing of a conductor's arm, the reaction time to lights on a drag strip, etc.)
 2×102: IBM 602 1946 computer.

Kiloscale computing (103) 
 92×103: Intel 4004 First commercially available full function CPU on a chip, released in 1971
 500×103 Colossus computer vacuum tube supercomputer 1943

Megascale computing (106) 
 1×106: Computing power of the Motorola 68000 commercial computer introduced in 1979. This is also the minimum computing power of a Type 0 Kardashev civilization.
 1.2×106: IBM 7030 "Stretch" transistorized supercomputer 1961

Gigascale computing (109) 
 1×109: ILLIAC IV 1972 supercomputer does first computational fluid dynamics problems
 1.354×109: Intel Pentium III commercial computing 1999
 147.6×109: Intel Core i7-980X Extreme Edition commercial computing 2010

Terascale computing (1012) 
 1.34×1012: Intel ASCI Red 1997 Supercomputer
 1.344×1012 GeForce GTX 480 in 2010 from Nvidia at its peak performance
 4.64×1012: Radeon HD 5970 in 2009 from AMD (under ATI branding) at its peak performance
 5.152×1012: S2050/S2070 1U GPU Computing System from Nvidia
 11.3×1012 :GeForce GTX 1080 Ti in 2017
 13.7×1012: Radeon RX Vega 64 in 2017
 15.0×1012: Nvidia Titan V in 2017
 80×1012: IBM Watson
 170×1012: Nvidia DGX-1 The initial Pascal based DGX-1 delivered 170 teraflops of half precision processing.
 478.2×1012 IBM BlueGene/L 2007 Supercomputer
 960×1012 Nvidia DGX-1 The Volta-based upgrade increased calculation power of Nvidia DGX-1 to 960 teraflops.

Petascale computing (1015) 

 1.026×1015: IBM Roadrunner 2009 Supercomputer
 1.32×1015: Nvidia GeForce 4000 Series RTX4090 Consumer graphics card, achieves 1.32 petaflops in AI applications, October 2022
 2×1015: Nvidia DGX-2 a 2 Petaflop Machine Learning system (the newer DGX A100 has 5 Petaflop performance)
10×1015 (1016): Minimum computing power of a Type I Kardashev civilization
 11.5×1015: Google TPU pod containing 64 second-generation TPUs, May 2017
 17.17×1015: IBM Sequoia's LINPACK performance, June 2013
 20×1015: Roughly the hardware-equivalent of the human brain according to Kurzweil. Published in his 1999 book: The Age of Spiritual Machines: When Computers Exceed Human Intelligence
 33.86×1015: Tianhe-2's LINPACK performance, June 2013
 36.8×1015: Estimated computational power required to simulate a human brain in real time.
 93.01×1015: Sunway TaihuLight's LINPACK performance, June 2016
143.5×1015: Summit's LINPACK performance, November 2018

Exascale computing (1018) 

 1×1018: The U.S. Department of Energy and NSA estimated in 2008 that they would need exascale computing around 2018
 1×1018: Fugaku 2020 supercomputer in single precision mode
 1.1x1018: Frontier 2022 supercomputer
 1.88×1018: U.S. Summit achieves a peak throughput of this many operations per second, whilst analysing genomic data using a mixture of numerical precisions.
 2.43×1018 Folding@home distributed computing system during COVID-19 pandemic response

Zettascale computing (1021)

 1×1021: Accurate global weather estimation on the scale of approximately 2 weeks. Assuming Moore's law remains applicable, such systems may be feasible around 2035.

A zettascale computer system could generate more single floating point data in one second than was stored by any digital means on Earth in the first quarter of 2011.

Beyond zettascale computing (>1021)
1.12×1036: Estimated computational power of a Matrioshka brain, assuming 1.87×1026 watt power produced by solar panels and 6 GFLOPS/watt efficiency.
4×1048: Estimated computational power of a Matrioshka brain whose power source is the Sun, the outermost layer operates at 10 kelvins, and the constituent parts operate at or near the Landauer limit and draws power at the efficiency of a Carnot engine
5×1058: Estimated power of a galaxy equivalent in luminosity to the Milky Way converted into Matrioshka brains.

See also
 Futures studies – study of possible, probable, and preferable futures, including making projections of future technological advances
 History of computing hardware (1960s–present)
 List of emerging technologies – new fields of technology, typically on the cutting edge. Examples include genetics, robotics, and nanotechnology (GNR).
 Artificial intelligence – computer mental abilities, especially those that previously belonged only to humans, such as speech recognition, natural language generation, etc.
 History of artificial intelligence (AI)
 Strong AI – hypothetical AI as smart as a human.
 Quantum computing
 Timeline of quantum computing and communication
 Moore's law – observation (not actually a law) that, over the history of computing hardware, the number of transistors on integrated circuits doubles approximately every two years. The law is named after Intel co-founder Gordon Moore, who described the trend in his 1965 paper.
 Supercomputer
 History of supercomputing
 Superintelligence
 Timeline of computing
 Technological singularity – hypothetical point in the future when computer capacity rivals that of a human brain, enabling the development of strong AI — artificial intelligence at least as smart as a human.
 The Singularity Is Near – book by Raymond Kurzweil dealing with the progression and projections of development of computer capabilities, including beyond human levels of performance.
 TOP500 – list of the 500 most powerful (non-distributed) computer systems in the world

References

External links 
 Historical and projected growth in supercomputer capacity

Computing